Lappalainen is a Finnish surname. Notable people with the surname include:

Kalle Lappalainen (1877–1965), Finnish sport shooter
Lasse Lappalainen (born 1989), Finnish ice hockey player
Martti Lappalainen (1902–1941), Finnish cross-country skier and biathlete
Onni Lappalainen (1922–1971), Finnish gymnast
Tauno Lappalainen (1898–1973), Finnish cross-country skier
Lassi Lappalainen (born 1998), Finnish footballer

Finnish-language surnames